Jonathan André McDonald Porras (born October 28, 1987 in San Jose) is a Costa Rican professional footballer for Liga FPD club Herediano.

Career

Club

McDonald made his professional debut as a 16-year-old with AD Carmelita, making three appearances in his first season. In 2006, he moved to top Costa Rican side CS Herediano. During his stay with Herediano he appeared in 41 First Division matches, scoring 17 goals.

McDonald joined the Vancouver Whitecaps on August 5, 2010. He made his Whitecaps debut as a second-half substitute coming on for striker Cornelius Stewart during a 1-0 victory at NSC Minnesota Stars on August 14, and made his first start for Vancouver on September 11 in 3-0 victory at Crystal Palace Baltimore.
On October 19, 2010, the Vancouver Whitecaps released McDonald, along with five fellow players, citing their need to purge certain players in preparation for their upcoming promotion to Major League Soccer.

On November 14, 2011, Kalmar FF of Allsvenskan in Sweden announced they had signed McDonald on a three-year contract, starting January 2012.

On 13 November 2019, Al Ahli has signed McDonald for one seasons from Alajuelense.

International
McDonald has represented his native Costa Rica at both the U-20 and U-23 Olympic levels, and made his debut for the senior side on August, 2011, against Ecuador.

International goals
Scores and results list Costa Rica's goal tally first.

Trivia
As a marketing gag, McDonald changed his name on his jersey during a match (a 0-2 loss on 31 May 2020 against Deportivo Saprissa) to Burger King instead of McDonald.

Honours
Alajuelense
 Liga FPD: Clausura 2011, Apertura 2011

Individual
 Liga FPD Top Scorer: 2017–18

References

External links
 
 
 

1987 births
Living people
Footballers from San José, Costa Rica
Costa Rican people of Jamaican descent
Association football forwards
Costa Rican footballers
Costa Rica international footballers
A.D. Carmelita footballers
C.S. Herediano footballers
Vancouver Whitecaps (1986–2010) players
L.D. Alajuelense footballers
Allsvenskan players
Kalmar FF players
Liga FPD players
Al Ahli SC (Doha) players
Qatar Stars League players
USSF Division 2 Professional League players
Footballers at the 2011 Pan American Games
Costa Rican expatriate footballers
Expatriate soccer players in Canada
Expatriate footballers in Sweden
Expatriate footballers in Qatar
Costa Rican expatriate sportspeople in Canada
Costa Rican expatriate sportspeople in Sweden
Costa Rican expatriate sportspeople in Qatar
2015 CONCACAF Gold Cup players
2019 CONCACAF Gold Cup players
Pan American Games competitors for Costa Rica
Costa Rica under-20 international footballers